Max Weinreich ( Maks Vaynraych; , Meyer Lazarevich Vaynraykh; 22 April 1894 – 29 January 1969) was a Russian-American-Jewish linguist, specializing in sociolinguistics and Yiddish, and the father of the linguist Uriel Weinreich, who edited the Modern Yiddish-English English-Yiddish Dictionary.

He is known for popularising the phrase "A language is a dialect with an army and navy".

Biography 

Weinreich began his studies in a German school in Goldingen (modern Kuldīga), transferring to the gymnasium in Libau (modern Liepāja) after four years. He then lived in Daugavpils and Łódź. Between 1909 and 1912, he resided in Saint Petersburg, where he attended I. G. Eizenbet's private Jewish gymnasium for boys. He was raised in a German-speaking family but became fascinated with Yiddish.

In the early 1920s, Weinreich lived in Germany and pursued studies in linguistics at the universities of Berlin and Marburg. In 1923, under the direction of German linguist  in Marburg, he completed his dissertation, entitled "Studien zur Geschichte und dialektischen Gliederung der jiddischen Sprache" (Studies in the History and Dialect Distribution of the Yiddish language). The dissertation was published in 1993 under the title Geschichte der jiddischen Sprachforschung ("History of Yiddish Linguistics").

In 1925, Weinreich was the cofounder, along with Nochum Shtif, Elias Tcherikower, and Zalman Reisen, of YIVO (originally called the Yidisher Visnshaftlekher Institut — Yiddish Scientific Institute). Although the institute was officially founded during a conference in Berlin in August 1925, the centre of its activities was in Wilno (now Vilnius, Lithuania), which eventually became its official headquarters as well. YIVO's first office in Wilno was in a room in Weinreich's apartment. Remembered as the guiding force of the institute, Weinreich directed its linguistic, or philological section in the period before the Second World War.

Weinreich was in Denmark with his wife, Regina Shabad Weinreich, the daughter of a notable doctor and Jewish leader of Wilno Zemach Shabad, and his older son, Uriel, when World War II broke out in 1939. Regina returned to Vilnius, but Max and Uriel stayed abroad, moving to New York City in March 1940. His wife and younger son, Gabriel, joined them there during the brief period when Vilnius was in independent Lithuania. Weinreich became a professor of Yiddish at City College of New York and re-established YIVO in New York.

Publications 
Weinreich translated Sigmund Freud and Ernst Toller into Yiddish.

Weinreich is often cited as the author of a facetious quip distinguishing between languages and dialects: "A language is a dialect with an army and navy" ("אַ שפּראַך איז אַ דיאַלעקט מיט אַן אַרמײ און פֿלאָט", "a shprakh iz a dialekt mit an armey un flot"), but he was then explicitly quoting an auditor at one of his lectures.

Publications in English:

 History of the Yiddish Language (Volumes 1 and 2) ed. Paul (Hershl) Glasser. New Haven: Yale University Press, 2008.
 Hitler's professors: the Part of Scholarship in Germany's Crimes Against the Jewish People.  New Haven: Yale University Press, 1999.
 History of the Yiddish language.  trans. Shlomo Noble, with the assistance of Joshua A. Fishman. Chicago: University of Chicago Press, 1980. [Footnotes omitted.]

In Yiddish and German:

 Bilder fun der yidisher literaturgeshikhte fun di onheybn biz Mendele Moykher-Sforim, 1928.
 Das Jiddische Wissenschaftliche Institut ("Jiwo") die wissenschaftliche Zentralstelle des Ostjudentums, 1931.
 Fun beyde zaytn ployt: dos shturemdike lebn fun Uri Kovnern, dem nihilist, 1955
 Geschichte der jiddischen Sprachforschung. herausgegeben von Jerold C. Frakes,  1993
 Di geshikhte fun beyzn beyz, 1937.
 Geshikhte fun der yidisher shprakh: bagrifn, faktn, metodn, 1973.
 Hitlers profesorn : heylek fun der daytsher visnshaft in daytshland farbrekhns kegn yidishn folk.  Nyu-York: Yidisher visnshaftlekher institut, Historishe sektsye, 1947.
 Mekhires-Yosef: ... aroysgenumen fun seyfer "Tam ve-yashar" un fun andere sforim ..., 1923.
 Der Onheyb: zamlbukh far literatur un visnshaft, redaktirt fun D. Aynhorn, Sh. Gorelik, M. Vaynraykh, 1922.
 Oysgeklibene shriftn, unter der redaktsye fun Shmuel Rozhanski, 1974.
 Der oytser fun der yidisher shprakh fun Nokhem Stutshkov; unter der redaktsye fun Maks Vaynraykh, c. 1950
 Praktishe gramatik fun der yidisher shprakh F. Haylperin un M. Vaynraykh, 1929.
 Shtaplen fir etyudn tsu der yidisher shprakhvisnshaft un literaturgeshikhte, 1923.
 Shturemvint bilder fun der yidisher geshikhte in zibtsntn yorhundert
 Di shvartse pintelekh.  Vilne: Yidisher visnshaftlekher institut, 1939.
 Di Yidishe visnshaft in der hayntiker tsayt. Nyu-York: 1941.

References

Sources 
 David E. Fishman, The Rise of Modern Yiddish Culture, University of Pittsburgh Press (2005), .
 Gershon David Hundert, YIVO Encyclopedia of Jews in Eastern Europe, Yale University Press (2008), .

1890s births
1969 deaths
People from Kuldīga
People from Courland Governorate
Jews from the Russian Empire
Emigrants from the Russian Empire to the United States
American people of Latvian-Jewish descent
Linguists from Latvia
Linguists from the United States
Linguists of Yiddish
History of YIVO
20th-century linguists